The 1999 FIS Freestyle Skiing World Cup was the twentieth World Cup season in freestyle skiing organised by International Ski Federation. The season started on 9 January 1999 and ended on 21 March 1999. This season included four disciplines: aerials, moguls, dual moguls and ballet. 

Dual moguls counted as season title and was awarded with small crystal globe separately from moguls. Ballet title for men was not awarded.

Men

Moguls

Aerials

Ballet

Ladies

Moguls

Aerials

Ballet

Men's standings

Overall 

Standings after 14 races.

Moguls 

Standings after 5 races.

Aerials 

Standings after 4 races.

Dual moguls 

Standings after 3 races.

Ladies' standings

Overall 

Standings after 14 races.

Moguls 

Standings after 5 races.

Aerials 

Standings after 4 races.

Ballet 

Standings after 2 races.

Dual moguls 

Standings after 3 races.

Standings: Nations Cup

Overall 

Standings after 28 races.

Men 

Standings after 14 races.

Ladies 

Standings after 14 races.

References

FIS Freestyle Skiing World Cup
World Cup
World Cup